Doug Grean is an American record producer, audio engineer, guitarist, based in Los Angeles. He has worked with artists Sheryl Crow, Ricki Lee Jones, Glen Campbell, Scott Weiland, Slash, Velvet Revolver, Stone Temple Pilots, The Crystal Method, Tim McGraw, Cyndi Lauper, Annabella Lwin (Bow Wow Wow), Corey Glover (Living Color), Camp Freddy, DJ Hurricane and John Taylor (Duran Duran). Grean was formerly the lead guitarist and touring musical director for Scott Weiland and the Wildabouts. Some of Grean's television appearances with Weiland include: VH1 Legends, Last Call with Carson Daly, The Tonight Show with Jay Leno, and the Grammy awards with Velvet Revolver as keyboardist, performing "All Across the Universe" with Stevie Wonder, Norah Jones, Bono, Steven Tyler, Brian Wilson, and Alison Krauss.

Grean is a multi-instrumentalist; he plays guitar, bass, keyboards, mandolin, lap steel, and banjo. He is most noted for morphing electric guitar sounds, unique and highly stylized. "I’m constantly trying to wring new and exciting voices from the sometimes-mundane electric guitar,” Grean explains. "Some end up sounding very ambient, but others sound like synthesizers, or like string sections." His hallmark rock production sound often incorporates electronic music and horns, as well as traditional Americana instruments such as accordion, hammer dulcimer.

Grean was born April 12, 1966, in Portchester, New York. He discovered guitar and mandolin at age 13, and formed a band with his friends which developed into a popular Grateful Dead-influenced jam band, Crimson Rose, drawing standing-room-only crowds throughout the Tri-State area at clubs where he was too young to enter. At 18, Grean moved to New Orleans to study music at Tulane University. Over the next 10 years, he became a devoted student of New Orleans' style jazz, blues and funk, honing his guitar chops by performing extensively in the city’s most authentic venues. During that time, Grean jammed in nightclubs alongside George Porter Jr. (The Meters), Ivan Neville, Willie Green (The Neville Brothers), and Russell Batiste.

In 1992, Grean moved to Los Angeles, where he engineered at Clubhouse studios (Burbank, California) and Artisan studios (Hollywood, California), and then produced and engineered at Softdrive Records (Scott Weiland's studio in Burbank, California) for 15 years.

Grean currently records and produces from his studio, DGSounde Studios, in Pasadena, California. He also writes and plays gigs around Los Angeles and Long Beach in his New Orleans funk band, the Terpsichords.

Discography
Scott Weiland – It's the Most Wonderful Time of the Year (2011) Softdrive/Rhino
Scott Weiland – A Compilation of SW Covers (2011) Softdrive
The Other Side OF Morning – Letter's from your Love the Mad Man (2011) 
Stone Temple Pilots – Stone Temple Pilots (2010) Atlantic
The Color Turning – Good Hands Bad Blood (2009) Softdrive/Sony
Something To Burn – Transitions (2008) Softdrive/Sony
Scott Weiland – Happy In Galoshes (2008) Softdrive/Sony
Craig Gore – Ten Year Sleep (2007) Independent
The Actual – In Stitches (2007) Softdrive/Sony
Velvet Revolver – Libertad (2007) RCA
Scott Weiland – Bug motion picture soundtrack (2007) Lionsgate
Last of the Believers – Paper ships Under a Burning Bridge (2007) LOTB Inc.
Camp Freddy – Employee of the Month motion picture soundtrack (2006) Lionsgate
Kevin Max – Between the Fence and the Universe (2005) Infinity
The Actual – Bewitched motion picture soundtrack (2005) Sony
King Straggler – King Straggler (2005) Independent
Velvet Revolver – Live Bonus DVD (2004) RCA
Velvet Revolver – Fantastic Four motion picture soundtrack (2004) Windup
Velvet Revolver – Contraband (2004) RCA
Sheryl Crow – C'mon C'mon (2002) Interscope
The Crystal Method – Community Service (2002) Geffen
The Crystal Method – Tweekend (2001) Geffen
Scott Weiland – Not Another Teen Movie motion picture soundtrack (2001) Maverick
Scott Weiland – Austin Powers: The Spy Who Shagged Me motion picture soundtrack (2000) Warner Bros.
Scott Weiland – Ready To Rumble motion picture soundtrack (2000) Atlantic
Stone Temple Pilots – Shangri-La Dee Da (2000) Atlantic
Stone Temple Pilots – The Stoned Immaculate: A Tribute To The Doors (2000) Elektra

References

External links
 Official website

Record producers from New York (state)
American audio engineers
Living people
People from Port Chester, New York
Guitarists from New York (state)
American male guitarists
Engineers from New York (state)
Year of birth missing (living people)
21st-century American keyboardists
21st-century American male musicians